Hirundichthys is a genus of flying fish. They have elongated, moderately thick, ventrally flattened bodies. The pectoral branch of the lateral line is absent. The upper jaw  is not protrusible. The dorsal fin has fewer or equal (rarely one more) rays than the anal fin; the dorsal fin is low, with the anterior rays the longest, the pectoral fins are strikingly long, reaching to or almost to caudal fin base; pelvic fins are long, reaching beyond the anal fin origin, and their insertion is closer to the anal fin origin than to the pectoral fin insertion.

Species
Twelve species in this genus are recognized:
 Hirundichthys affinis (Günther, 1866) (fourwing flyingfish)
 Hirundichthys albimaculatus (Fowler, 1934) (whitespot flyingfish)
 Hirundichthys coromandelensis (Hornell, 1923) (Coromandel flyingfish)
 Hirundichthys ilma (F. E. Clarke, 1899)
 Hirundichthys indicus Shakhovskoy & Parin, 2013
 Hirundichthys indicus indicus Shakhovskoy & Parin, 2013
 Hirundichthys indicus orientalis Shakhovskoy & Parin, 2013
 Hirundichthys marginatus (Nichols & Breder, 1928) (banded flyingfish)
 Hirundichthys oxycephalus (Bleeker, 1853)
 Hirundichthys oxycephalus frereensis Shakhovskoy & Parin, 2013
 Hirundichthys oxycephalus oxycephalus (Bleeker, 1853) (bony flyingfish)
 Hirundichthys rufipinnis (Valenciennes, 1847) (Redfin flyingfish) 
 Hirundichthys rondeletii (Valenciennes, 1847) (blackwing flyingfish)
 Hirundichthys socotranus (Steindachner, 1902)
 Hirundichthys speculiger (Valenciennes, 1847) (mirrorwing flyingfish)
 Hirundichthys volador (Jordan, 1884)

References

 
Cypsellurinae